Major General Frank Cadle Mahin (May 27, 1887 – July 24, 1942) was an American Major General during the period of World War II.  He died in an airplane crash while on active duty commanding the 33rd Division.  Mahin was one of the highest-ranked American generals to die in the United States during World War II along with General Malin Craig, Major General Herbert Dargue, Major General Robert Olds, Major General Paul Newgarden, Major General William H. Rupertus, and Major General Stonewall Jackson.

Mahin was partially educated in England.  He graduated from Harvard University in 1909.  Brigadier General Theodore Roosevelt Jr. was another general from the 1909 Harvard graduating class who died during World War II.  

Mahin was buried at Arlington National Cemetery.  His son Colonel Frank C. Mahin, Jr. (1923–1972) was buried with him.  His wife Mauree Pickering Mahin died on May 27, 1985, at age 94 and is also buried at Arlington National Cemetery.

References

External links
Arlington National Cemetery
Generals of World War II

1887 births
1942 deaths
Accidental deaths in Tennessee
Burials at Arlington National Cemetery
Harvard University alumni
Military personnel from Iowa
United States Army generals
United States Army generals of World War II
United States Army personnel of World War I
United States Army personnel killed in World War II
Victims of aviation accidents or incidents in 1942
Victims of aviation accidents or incidents in the United States